Aman Hakim Khan (born 23 November 1996) is an Indian cricketer. He received education from Avalon Heights International School  He made his List A debut on 9 March 2021, for Mumbai in the 2020–21 Vijay Hazare Trophy. He made his Twenty20 debut on 4 November 2021, for Mumbai in the 2021–22 Syed Mushtaq Ali Trophy.

In February 2022, Khan was bought by Kolkata Knight Riders in the auction for the 2022 Indian Premier League (IPL) tournament. He played a single match for the side during the 2022 season, and in November 2022 was traded to the Delhi Capitals in exchange for Shardul Thakur ahead of the 2023 auction.

References

External links
 

1996 births
Living people
Indian cricketers
Mumbai cricketers
Place of birth missing (living people)